Pierik may refer to:

Places 
, a region in Overijsse, Zwolle, the Netherlands

Surname 
Annie Schreijer-Pierik (born 1953), Dutch politician
Eric Pierik (born 1959), Dutch field hockey player
John Pierik (1949–2018), Dutch Olympic shooter